The Puerto Rico women's national field hockey team represents Puerto Rico in women's international field hockey competitions and is controlled by the Puerto Rican Hockey Federation, the governing body for field hockey in Puerto Rico.

They have never participated at the Pan American Games or in the Pan American Cup.

Tournament record

Central American and Caribbean Games
2002 – 5th place
2010 – 7th place
 2023 – Qualified

Pan American Challenge
2015 – 4th place

FIH Hockey Series
2018–19 – First round

Hockey World League
2014–15 – Round 1

See also
Puerto Rico men's national field hockey team

References

Americas women's national field hockey teams
National team
Field hockey